Allan Rirme Migi (1960 – 22 October 2020) was a Papua New Guinean bishop who served as archbishop and primate of the Anglican Church of Papua New Guinea from 3 September 2017 to 11 May 2020. He had previously served as Bishop of the New Guinea Islands between 2000 and 2017.

Migi was consecrated Bishop of the Diocese of New Guinea Islands in 2000. The senior bishop of his province, he was elected by the Provincial Council of five members in July 2017, to replace Clyde Igara as the 7th archbishop and primate of the Anglican Church of Papua New Guinea. His enthronement took place at All Souls Church, in Lae, on 3 September 2017. His leadership was based in Lae, in the Morobe Province, since November 2017. He also oversaw the Diocese of Aipo Rongo. Anglican bishops from the Church of England, the Anglican Church of Australia, the Anglican Church of Aotearoa, New Zealand and Polynesia, and the Anglican Church of Melanesia, attended his enthronement.

Migi resigned on 11 May 2020 due to ill health. He died on 22 October 2020 at his home village, Gasmata, in the Western Province.

References

External links
New archbishop for Papua New Guinea, Anglican Ink, 4 September 2017

1960 births
2020 deaths
Anglican archbishops of Papua New Guinea
Papua New Guinean Anglicans
20th-century Anglican bishops in Oceania
21st-century Anglican bishops in Oceania
21st-century Anglican archbishops
People from West New Britain Province
Anglican bishops of the New Guinea Islands